Arbab Town is a town of Rajana, Punjab, Pakistan. 
It is 15 km away from Toba Tek Singh. It is located west of Faisalabad, east of Multan, south of Toba Tek Singh and north of Kamalia and Vehari. Arbab Town is a new territory. Many people from the villages nearby going there to buying Plats,(Earth) to developing their houses, The closest villages are Chak No. 285 GB, & New Interchange is going to build beside the Arbab Town Rajana of Karachi Lahore Motorway.

Gallery

References

Populated places in Toba Tek Singh District